Pseudotetrasauropus is an ichnogenus of dinosaur footprint. In 2020 based on the 60 cm (2 ft) long footprint Molina-Pérez and Larramendi estimated the size of the animal at 9.1 meters (30 ft) and 2 tonnes (2.2 short tons).

See also

 List of dinosaur ichnogenera

References

 

Dinosaur trace fossils
Sauropodomorphs